KKBR (97.1 FM) - branded as Mix 97.1 - is a commercial radio station in Billings, Montana. Licensed to Billings, Montana, United States, the station serves the Billings area.  The station is currently owned by Townsquare License, LLC. The station has obtained a construction permit from the FCC for a power increase to 100,000 watts.

Former programming
Notable former personalities on the station on weekdays included:
Bwana Johnny/Ed Donohue 6am-10am 2000-2001
Jonathon Stevens/Ed Donohue 6am-10am 2001-2002
Ed Donohue/Jackie Bell 6am-10am 2003-2007
Jackie Bell from 10am-3pm
Jami Bond from 10am-3pm 
John Thomas from 3pm-7pm
Tom Leggett from 3pm-7pm 
Jay Brandon from 3pm-7pm
The Mike Harvey Show from 7pm - midnight
Notable former personalities on the station on Saturdays included:
Major Miller's Great Gold 6am - noon
Mike Harvey's Supergold 7pm - midnight
Charlie Tuna's Back to the 70s

Notable former personalities on the station on Sundays included:
Machine Gun Kelly's American Hitlist from 8 to 11a.m.

Types of music
The radio station previously aired classic hits, focusing on the hits from 1968 to 1988, as "97.1 K-Bear".
On July 3, 2013 after stunting with Christmas music as "97.1 Santa FM", the station launched a Top 40/CHR format as "PopCrush 97.1" with a weekend of commercial free music, including a contest to be the first person to call the station at the first commercial break. The first 3 songs as PopCrush 97.1 were Pitbull's "Feel This Moment" featuring Christina Aguilera, Justin Timberlake's "Mirrors", and Rihanna's "Umbrella" featuring Jay-Z. On July 25, 2016 KKBR rebranded as "97.1 Kiss FM".

On August 29, 2022 it was announced that big changes are coming to this station.

On September 16, 2022 KKBR shifted from Top 40/CHR to hot adult contemporary, and rebranded as "Mix 97.1".

Slogans
"Good Times, Great Oldies"–thru 2004
"Super Hits of the 60s & 70s" 2004–2008?
"Billings' Greatest Hits for over 20 Years"–2013
"Billings' Greatest Hits" 2010–2013
"Billings' Hit Music" 2013–2022
"Billings' Best Mix of 2K to Today" 2022-present

Ownership
In October 2007, a deal was reached for KKBR to be acquired by GAP Broadcasting II LLC (Samuel Weller, president) from Clear Channel Communications as part of a 57-station deal with a total reported sale price of $74.78 million.  What eventually became GapWest Broadcasting was folded into Townsquare Media on August 13, 2010.

Previous logos

References

External links

KBR
Radio stations established in 1963
1963 establishments in Montana
Townsquare Media radio stations
Hot adult contemporary radio stations in the United States